Stare Guty may refer to the following places:
Stare Guty, Grajewo County in Podlaskie Voivodeship (north-east Poland)
Stare Guty, Kolno County in Podlaskie Voivodeship (north-east Poland)
Stare Guty, Warmian-Masurian Voivodeship (north Poland)